Talampicillin is a beta lactam antibiotic from the penicillin family. It is an acid stable prodrug that was administered orally. It is not approved by the FDA for use in the United States. It should be avoided in Liver diseases

Synthesis
Ampicillin remains the penicillin of choice for many infections  because of its oral activity and good potency against Gram-negative bacteria. A number of prodrugs have been examined in attempts to improve upon the pharmacodynamic characteristics, and one of these is talampicillin.

One synthesis involved protecting the primary amino group of ampicillin (1) as the enamine with ethyl acetoacetate (2). THis was then esterified by reaction with 3-bromopthalide (3), and the enamine was carefully hydrolyzed with dilute HCl in acetonitrile to produce talampicillin (4).

References

Penicillins
Isobenzofurans
Lactones